Georges Louis Frederic Boillot (August 3, 1884 – May 19, 1916) was a French Grand Prix motor racing driver and World War I fighter pilot.

Biography
Born in Valentigney, Doubs, Boillot was a mechanic by training who began automobile racing in 1908. He went on to join drivers Paul Zuccarelli and Jules Goux to help create a novel range of racing cars as part of the Peugeot team. He debuted with them in 1909 in the Coupe de l'Auto at Rambouillet and in 1910, went to Italy to compete in the Targa Florio.

At Dieppe, France, on June 26, 1912, Georges Boillot won the French Grand Prix, in his Peugeot L76, a vehicle designed by a group consisting of the young Swiss engineer, Ernest Henry in association with Zuccarelli, Goux and Boillot. This was the first motorcar in the world to have an engine with two overhead  camshafts and four valves per cylinder. Boillot won the Coupe de l'Auto in 1913 and became the darling of French racing fans when he won his second straight French Grand Prix at Amiens, becoming the first driver to win the French Grand Prix twice.

That same year, his Peugeot teammate, Jules Goux became the first Frenchman to win the Indianapolis 500. The following year, France sent a number of competitors to the Indiana speedway where on May 27, during qualifying, Boillot came tantalizing close to breaking the 100 mile-an-hour (161 km/h) barrier when he set a new speed record of 99.86 mph (160.70 km/h). Much faster than any other driver, Boillot would most likely have won the race with ease had it not been for repeated tire trouble. He ended up finishing 14th while his fellow Frenchmen finished in the top four positions with René Thomas getting the win.

In what would turn out to be his last race, the 1914 French Grand Prix at Lyon, his Peugeot was literally falling apart at the end. After demonstrating his tremendous skills by keeping the vehicle running and near the lead, it finally overheated on the last lap and he was forced to retire.

With the outbreak of World War I, Boillot joined the new French Air Force, but was initially given the task of being a driver for the commander-in-chief, General Joseph Joffre, who used Boillot's fast driving to maintain personal oversight of French armies. Frustrated at his duties away from the front lines he requested to join a fighting unit and promptly embarked on becoming an Ace flyer. During his time as a flyer, he won the Croix de Guerre and the Legion d'Honneur. On April 21, 1916 his plane was shot down in a dogfight with five German Fokkers, of which he was able to shoot one down before he himself was downed, crashing near Bar-le-Duc. Severely injured, he died in a military hospital at Vadelaincourt, Meuse.

Legacy
In his honor, several places in France named a street for him and there is a George Boillot School in Montlhéry in the Essonne département near Paris.

His brother André was also a race driver and at war's end, won the 1919 Targa Florio. Georges' son, Jean, became director-general of Peugeot Talbot Sport cars and in 1981 was responsible for involving Peugeot in rallying.

Indy 500 results

External links 

Grand Prix History - Hall of Fame , Georges Boillot

Citations

1884 births
1916 deaths
People from Valentigney
Aviators killed by being shot down
French military personnel killed in World War I
French racing drivers
Grand Prix drivers
Indianapolis 500 drivers
Sportspeople from Doubs